The 2003 Worthing Borough Council election took place on 1 May 2003 to elect members of Worthing Borough Council in West Sussex, England. One third of the council was up for election and the Liberal Democrats lost overall control of the council to no overall control. Overall turnout was 28.61%.

The election saw 38 candidates from 4 parties competing for the 13 seats which were being contested. 7 sitting councillors stood down at the election which saw the Liberal Democrats attempting to defend the majority they had won in the previous election in 2002. The Liberal Democrats campaigned on the record of their "Clean and Safe Worthing" campaign and on plans to upgrade the leisure centre and replace the Aquarena. However the Conservatives attacked them for stopping improvements to the seafront and for the poor state of facilities in Worthing. The Green and Labour parties also stood candidates but did not contest all of the wards with Labour only putting up 3 candidates.

The results saw the Conservatives make one gain from the Liberal Democrats in Selden ward, with the winner, Jack Saheid, becoming the first Muslim councillor on Worthing council. After the Liberal Democrats failed by 6 votes to gain Gaisford from the Conservatives, both parties ended the election on 18 seats making Worthing a hung council. The results meant that the Liberal Democrat mayor of Worthing had the casting vote on the council.

After the election, the composition of the council was:
Conservative 18
Liberal Democrat 18

Election result

Ward results

References

2003 English local elections
2003
2000s in West Sussex